Guaranty Trust Bank (Uganda), commonly referred to as GT Bank (Uganda), is a commercial bank in Uganda. It is one of the commercial banks licensed by Bank of Uganda, the central bank of that country and the national banking regulator.

GT Bank (Uganda) is a retail financial services institution that provides commercial banking services to individuals and small to medium-sized corporate clients. , the asset valuation of the bank was estimated to be US$30.63 million (USh 104.9 billion), with shareholders' equity of US$11 million (USh 39.7 billion) GT Bank (Uganda) is a subsidiary of Guaranty Trust Bank (GTB), a Nigerian financial services conglomerate with assets in excess of ₦2,525 billion .

History
GT Bank (Uganda) was founded in 2008 as Fina Bank (Uganda), a subsidiary of the Fina Bank Group based in Kenya.

In 2013, the Group sold 70 percent shareholding to GTB for a cash consideration of US$100 million. In January 2014, the bank rebranded to its current name to reflect its current shareholding.

Branch Network
, GT Bank Uganda has a network of branches at the following locations: (1) Main Branch: 56 Kira Road, Kamwookya, Kampala 

(2) Buganda Road Branch: 7 Buganda Road, Kampala 

(3) Nakivubo Road Branch: 34-38 Nakivubo Road, Kampala 

(4) Industrial Area Branch: 13 Mulwana Road, Kampala 

(5) Mbarara Branch: 52-54 High Street, Mbarara 

(6) Kyaliwajjala Branch: 31 Namugongo Road, Kyaliwajjala, Kira Municipality 

(7) Colville Street Branch: 5-6 Colville Street, Kampala 

(8) Makerere Branch: Makerere.

See also

List of banks in Uganda
Banking in Uganda
Guaranty Trust Bank (Kenya)
Guaranty Trust Bank (Rwanda)

References

Banks of Uganda
Banks established in 2008
2008 establishments in Uganda
Companies based in Kampala